Tell Uqair (Tell Uquair, Tell Aqair) is a tell or settlement mound northeast of Babylon and about  south of Baghdad in modern Babil Governorate, Iraq.

History of archaeological research
The site of Tell Uqair was excavated during World War II, in 1941 and 1942, by an Iraqi Directorate General of Antiquities team led by Seton Lloyd, with Taha Baqir and Fuad Safar. The buildings and artifacts discovered were primarily from the Ubaid period, the Uruk period, and the Jemdet Nasr period and included four Proto-Cuneiform tablets. A sounding was done by a team from the Heidelberg University in 1978.

Tell Uqair and its environment
Tell Uqair is a small mound just north of Tell Ibrahim, the large mound marking the site of ancient Kutha. The topography consists of two sub-mounds separated by what is apparently the bed of an ancient canal.

Occupation history
The site of Tell Uqair first had significant occupation during the Ubaid period, and grew to its greatest extent during the Jemdet Nasr and Uruk periods. Some Early Dynastic graves and a scattering of Akkadian and Babylonian artifacts indicate the location continued in limited use up through the time of Nebuchadnezzar. Because of clay tablets found at the site, it is believed to be the ancient town of Urum. The toponym for Urum is written in cuneiform as ÚR×Ú.KI (cuneiform: 𒌱𒆠), URUM4 = ÚR×ḪA (cuneiform: 𒌯), besides ÚR×A.ḪA.KI (cuneiform: 𒌬𒆠), from earlier (pre-Ur III) ÚR.A.ḪA.

The most prominent discovery at Tell Uquair was the "Painted Temple", a large complex similar in design to the "White Temple" found at Uruk. Some of the original frescos were still visible at the time of the excavation and were copied. Several frescos were recovered intact and sent to the Baghdad Museum. The temple is believed to date to the Uruk or early Jemdet Nasr period. A small adjacent Jemdet Nasr temple was of somewhat later construction and contained large amounts of pottery from that period.

See also

Cities of the ancient Near East

References

Further reading
Seton Lloyd, Ur-Al `Ubaid, Uquair and Eridu, in Ur in Retrospect: In Memory of Sir Leonard Woolley, Iraq, vol. 22, pp. 23–31, 1960
M. W. Green, Urum and Uqair, Acta Sumerologica, vol. 8, pp. 77–83, 1986
Piotr Steinkeller, On the Reading and Location of the Toponyms ÚR×Ú.KI and A.ḪA.KI,  Journal of Cuneiform Studies, Vol. 32, No. 1 (Jan., 1980), pp. 23–33 
Gilbert J. P. McEwan, The Writing of Urum in Pre-Ur III Sources, Journal of Cuneiform Studies, Vol. 33, No. 1 (Jan., 1981), pp. 56

External links
 Legrain, Leon. "Tell ‘Uqair “Painted Temple”." Museum Bulletin X, no. 3-4 (June, 1944): pp. 39-39
Diagram of Tell Uqair at the University of Minnesota
Leopard painting from Tell Uqair at UM
Mosaic cones from Tell Uqair at UM
Digitized tablets from (and thought to be from) Tell Uqair at CDLI

1941 archaeological discoveries
Uqair
Uqair
Uqair
Ubaid period
Jemdet Nasr period]
Uruk period